Charles Edward McGibbon (21 April 1880 – 2 May 1954) was an English footballer who played for several teams, including Woolwich Arsenal and Southampton, on a part-time basis while serving with the Royal Engineers. He also played one cricket match for Hampshire County Cricket Club.

Football career
McGibbon was born in Portsmouth, and joined the Royal Engineers, reaching the rank of sergeant. While serving at the Royal Garrison Artillery at Woolwich he came to the attention of Woolwich Arsenal, whom he joined in August 1905. He failed to get into the first team and after a spell with Eltham, he joined New Brompton in 1907.

New Brompton (now Gillingham) were playing in the Southern League under the management of former England international Stephen Smith, who was also team captain. In McGibbon's season at the club, New Brompton finished bottom of the table, avoiding relegation only due to the expansion of the league, but did achieve an FA Cup victory over First Division Sunderland, in which McGibbon scored a hat-trick. McGibbon had previously scored a hat-trick in the 6–0 victory over Shepherds Bush in the fifth qualifying round. In the first round match, played at Priestfield Stadium on 11 January 1908, Sunderland took the lead after half an hour from England international George Holley. New Brompton equalized immediately with a header from McGibbon, who followed up with two second-half goals to claim a 3–1 victory.

In the second round, New Brompton came up against Manchester City, then third in the Football League First Division. McGibbon scored in the first match, which ended 1–1, and again in the replay (from a penalty) but was unable to prevent the Football League club from claiming a 2–1 victory. McGibbon ended the 1907–08 season as New Brompton's top scorer with 22 goals from all competitions.

McGibbon played for Southern League Crystal Palace in the 1908–09 season, scoring a hat-trick in a 4–4 draw with Southampton at The Dell on 5 October 1908. This brought him to the attention of the Southampton directors, and when McGibbon's military duties took him to Portsmouth, he joined Southampton in May 1909.

Described as "physically well-suited for the role of centre-forward", McGibbon possessed a "powerful shot (and) influential leadership qualities". His opportunism in front of goal enabled him to score 19 goals in 28 league goals in the 1909–10 season, making him the "Saints'" top-scorer for the season.

In March 1910, his military duties took him back to Woolwich and he immediately found a place in a struggling Woolwich Arsenal team that was fighting relegation. He made his debut away to Chelsea on 28 March 1910 and scored the only goal in a 1–0 win. He followed that up with the winner in a 1–0 victory over Aston Villa and the equaliser in a 1–1 draw with Tottenham Hotspur. His three goals from four appearances helped Arsenal avoid relegation from the Football League First Division, by a margin of two points above Chelsea.

At the start of the following season, McGibbon moved on to join Leyton. After a spell at Reading, McGibbon returned to Southampton in November 1911, but failed to get back into the first team.

Later career
After the First World War, McGibbon found employment as the Chief Clerk in the Statistical Office at Netley Hospital and later worked for Supermarine at Woolston, Southampton.

He made one first-class appearance for Hampshire in July 1919, bowling one over and scoring one run in a County Championship match against Yorkshire.

His son, Douglas (1919–2002), played football for Southampton from 1938 to 1947, as well as for Fulham and Bournemouth & Boscombe Athletic.

References

External links
Profile on cricketarchive
Profile on cricinfo

1880 births
1954 deaths
Footballers from Portsmouth
English footballers
Royal Engineers A.F.C. players
Southern Football League players
Arsenal F.C. players
Crystal Palace F.C. players
Gillingham F.C. players
Reading F.C. players
Southampton F.C. players
English cricketers
Hampshire cricketers
Leyton F.C. players
Association football forwards